Among the fourteen British Overseas Territories, eight – Akrotiri and Dhekelia, the British Antarctic Territory, the British Indian Ocean Territory, the Falkland Islands, Gibraltar, the Pitcairn Islands, Saint Helena, Ascension and Tristan da Cunha, and South Georgia and the South Sandwich Islands – recognise and perform same-sex marriages. In the Sovereign Base Areas of Akrotiri and Dhekelia, only British military and civilian personnel can enter into same-sex marriages and civil partnerships.

The five Caribbean territories do not recognise same-sex unions. Three specify the right of opposite-sex couples to marry in their constitutions, though they have no laws prohibiting same-sex marriage. Same-sex civil partnerships are performed in the Cayman Islands and Bermuda.

United Kingdom government
The UK Government retains the right to impose same-sex marriage on territories that do not recognise the unions, as it did through an Order in Council to decriminalise homosexuality in recalcitrant territories in 2001. In February 2019, the Foreign Affairs Select Committee recommended that the UK Government impose a deadline on territories to legalise same-sex marriage and, if that deadline is not met, intervene through legislation or an Order in Council. The May Government later rejected this recommendation in a statement to parliament.

Recognition per territory

See also 
 Same-sex marriage in the United Kingdom
 Civil partnership in the United Kingdom
 LGBT rights in the United Kingdom (Overseas Territories)
 Same-sex marriage in Jersey
 Same-sex marriage in the Isle of Man
 Same-sex marriage in Guernsey

References 

 

LGBT in British Overseas Territories
Marriage, unions and partnerships in British Overseas Territories
State recognition of same-sex relationships